This is a list of films which have placed number one at the weekend box office in the United Kingdom during 1996.

Number one films

Highest-grossing films
Highest-grossing films for the calendar year

See also 
 List of British films — British films by year

References

Chronology

1996
United Kingdom
Box office number-one films